DeepL Translator is a neural machine translation service launched in August 2017 and owned by Cologne based DeepL SE. The translating system was first developed within Linguee and launched as entity DeepL. It initially offered translations between seven European languages and was gradually expanded to support 31 languages.

Its algorithm uses convolutional neural networks and an English pivot. It offers a paid subscription for additional features and access to its translation application programming interface.

Service

Translation methodology 
The service uses a proprietary algorithm with convolutional neural networks (CNNs) that have been trained with the Linguee database. According to the developers, the service uses a newer, improved architecture of neural networks, which results in a more natural sound of translations compared to competing services. The translation is said to be generated using a supercomputer that reaches 5.1 petaflops and is operated in Iceland with hydropower. In general, CNNs are slightly more suitable for long, coherent word sequences, but have so far not been used by the competition due to their weaknesses compared to recurrent neural networks. The weaknesses at DeepL are compensated for by supplemental techniques, some of which are publicly known.

Translator and subscription 
The translator can be used for free with a 5,000 characters limit per translation. Microsoft Word and PowerPoint files in Office Open XML file formats (.docx and .pptx) and PDF files can also be translated.

It offers a paid subscription called DeepL Pro, which has been available since March 2018, and includes application programming interface access and a software plug-in for computer-assisted translation tools, including SDL Trados Studio. Unlike the free version, translated texts are stated to not be saved on the server and the character limit is removed. The monthly pricing model includes a set amount of text, with texts beyond this calculated according to the number of characters.

Supported languages 
As of January 2023, the translation service supports the following languages:

Bulgarian
Chinese (Simplified)
Czech
Danish
Dutch
English (American and British)
Estonian
Finnish
French
German
Greek
Hungarian
Indonesian
Italian
Japanese
Korean
Latvian
Lithuanian
Norwegian (Bokmål)
Polish
Portuguese (Brazilian and European)
Romanian
Russian
Slovak
Slovene
Spanish
Swedish
Turkish
Ukrainian

History 
The translating system was first developed within Linguee by a team led by Chief technology officer Jaroslaw Kutylowski in 2016. It was launched as DeepL Translator on 28 August 2017, offering translations between English, German, French, Spanish, Italian, Polish and Dutch. With the launch, it claimed to have surpassed its competitors in self-conducted blind tests and BLEU scores, including Google Translate, Amazon Translate, Microsoft Translator and Facebook's translation feature. With the release of DeepL in 2017, Linguee's company name was changed to DeepL GmbH, while being also financed by advertising on its sister site linguee.com.

Support for Portuguese and Russian languages was added on 5 December 2018. In July 2019, Jaroslaw Kutylowski became CEO of DeepL GmbH and restructured the company into a Societas Europaea in 2021. Translation software for Microsoft Windows and macOS was released in September 2019. Support for Chinese (Simplified) and Japanese was added on 19 March 2020, which it claimed had surpassed aforementioned competitors as well as Baidu and Youdao. 13 more European languages were added in March 2021. On 25 May 2022, support for Indonesian and Turkish languages was added, while support for Ukrainian language was added on 14 September 2022. In January 2023, the company reached a valuation of 1 billion euro and became the most valued startup in Cologne.

DeepL Write 
In November 2022, DeepL launched a tool to improve monolingual texts in English and German, called DeepL Write. In December the company removed access, informing journalists that it was only for internal use and that DeepL Write will be launched in early 2023. The public beta version was finally released on January 17, 2023.

Reception 

Reception of DeepL Translator in 2017 has been generally positive, with TechCrunch appreciating it for the accuracy of its translations, stating that it was more accurate and nuanced than Google Translate, and Le Monde thanking its developers for translating French text into more 'French-sounding' expressions. A news article from the website of the Dutch television channel RTL Z stated that DeepL Translator "offers better translations […] when it comes to Dutch to English and vice versa". An Italian newspaper la Repubblica and a Latin American website "WWWhat's new?" showed praise as well. In 2020, Japanese website Gigazine found the Japanese translation to be accurate, even when the text was mixed with dialects.

Press noted it had far fewer languages available for translation than competing products. It also lacks a website translation feature and free app integrations. A 2018 paper by the University of Bologna evaluated the Italian to German translation capabilities and found the preliminary results to be in similar quality to Google Translate. In September 2021, Slator remarked that the language industry response was more measured than the press, while noting it is still highly regarded.

DeepL Translator won the 2020 Webby Award for Best Practices, and the 2020 Webby Award for Technical Achievement (Apps, Mobile, and Features), both in the category Apps, Mobile & Voice. DeepL.com was ranked 136th in the Alexa ranking of the most-visited sites in the world as of October 2021.

See also 
 Comparison of machine translation applications

References

Bibliography

External links 

Machine translation software
Multilingual websites
Natural language processing software
Free and open-source Android software
Products introduced in 2017
Translation websites